Cameron Ross Cleeland (born August 15, 1975) is an American football tight end who last played for the St. Louis Rams of the NFL. Previously he had played for the New Orleans Saints and New England Patriots and went to the University of Washington.

While a rookie with the Saints, he was struck in the eye by linebacker Andre Royal with a sock filled with coins during a hazing incident. Cleeland nearly lost his eye in addition to suffering a broken eye socket and broken nose. The injury permanently affected his eyesight.

References

1975 births
Living people
American football tight ends
New England Patriots players
New Orleans Saints players
People from Sedro-Woolley, Washington
Players of American football from Washington (state)
Sportspeople from the Seattle metropolitan area
St. Louis Rams players
Washington Huskies football players